William V. Gehrlein (born 1946) is a notable researcher in the areas of social choice theory, decision theory and graph theory. He received his B.S. in physics from Gannon College in Erie, Pennsylvania, in 1968, his  M.S. in physics from Pennsylvania State University in 1972, and his Ph.D. in business administration from Pennsylvania State University in 1975. His teaching interests are operations management and operations research. He is currently professor of business administration at the University of Delaware.

Notes

1946 births
Living people
University of Delaware faculty
American operations researchers
Eberly College of Science alumni
Gannon University alumni